Partyzanski District is an administrative subdivision of the city of Minsk, Belarus. It was named after the Soviet partisans and is the lesser populated district of the city.

Geography
The district is situated in the central-eastern area of the city and borders Tsentralny, Savyetski, Pyershamayski, Zavodski and Leninsky districts.

Transport
Partyzanski is served by the subway and tram networks. It is also crossed by the MKAD beltway .

See also
Victory Square

References

External links
 Partyzanski District official website

Districts of Minsk